Supreme Court Bar Association may refer to:
Supreme Court Bar Association (India)
Supreme Court Bar Association (Nepal)
Supreme Court Bar Association of Pakistan
Bangladesh Supreme Court Bar Association